This is a discography of Hildegard of Bingen's musical works.

 Gesänge der hl. Hildegard von Bingen. Schola der Benediktinerinnenabtei St. Hildegard, dir. M.-I. Ritscher. Bayer 100116, 1979.
 A Feather on the Breath of God: Sequences and Hymns by Abbess Hildegard of Bingen. Gothic Voices, dir. Christopher Page, Emma Kirkby (soprano). Hyperion CDA66039, 1981.
 Ordo virtutum. Sequentia, dir. Barbara Thornton. 2 disks. Deutsche Harmonia mundi 77051-2-RG, 1982.
 Symphoniae: Geistliche Gesänge/Spiritual Songs. Sequentia, dir. Barbara Thornton. Deutsche Harmonia mundi 770230-2-RG/RCA 77020, 1983.
 Hildegard von Bingen und ihre Zeit: Geistliche Musik des 12. Ensemble für frühe Musik Augsburg, Christophorus 74584, 1990.
 The Lauds of St. Ursula. Early Music Institute, dir. Thomas Binkley. Focus 911, 1991.
 Jouissance. Viriditas, dir. Juliette Hughes. Spectrum/Cistercian Publications, 1993.
 The Emma Kirkby Collection. Christopher Page, Hyperion 66227, 1993.
 Hildegard von Bingen: Canticles of Ecstasy. Sequentia, dir. Barbara Thornton. Deutsche Harmonia mundi 05472-77320-2, 1994.
 Hildegard von Bingen: Heavenly Revelations. Oxford Camerata, dir. Jeremy Summerly. Naxos 8.550998, 1994.
 Vision: The Music of Hildegard von Bingen. Richard Souther, Emily Van Evera, Sister Germaine Fritz, Catherine King. Angel Records 1994
 Voice of the Blood. Sequentia, dir. Barbara Thornton. 2 discs. Deutsche Harmonia mundi 05472-77346-2, 1995.
 O nobilissima viriditas. Catherine Schroeder, et al. Champeaux CSM 0006, 1995.
 Ordo Virtutum. Vox Animae, dir. Michael Fields. Etcetera Record Company BV CD KTC 1203, 1995.
 Monk and the Abbess: Music of Hildegard von Bingen and Meredith Monk. Musica Sacra, dir. Richard Westenburg, Catalyst 09026-68329-2, 1996.
 Symphony of the Harmony of Celestial Revelations. Sinfonye, dir. Stevie Wishart. Vol. 1. Celestial Harmonies 13127-2, 1996.
 Hildegard of Bingen: The Harmony of Heaven. Ellen Oak, Bison Publications 1, 1996.
 Hildegard von Bingen: O Jerusalem. Sequentia. Deutsche Harmonia Mundi 05472 77353 2, 1997. 
 11,000 Virgins: Chants for the Feast of St. Ursula. Anonymous 4, Harmonia Mundi 907200, 1997.
 Aurora. Sinfonye, dir. Stevie Wishart. Vol. 2. Celestial Harmonies 13128, 1997.
 Unfurling Love’s Creation: Chants by Hildegard von Bingen. Norma Gentile. Lyrichord Early Music Series (LEMS) 8027, 1997.
 Ordo virtutum. Sequentia, dir. Barbara Thornton. 2 discs. Deutsche Harmonia mundi 05472 77394 2, 1997.
 Hildegard von Bingen: Saints. Sequentia. 2 discs. Deutsche Harmonia Mundi 05472 77378 2, 1998.
 Hildegard of Bingen: Choral Music (Angelic Voices - Heavenly Music From A Medieval Abbey). Richard Vendome et al. The Gift of Music, 1998.
 Lux Vivens (Living Light). Jocelyn Montgomery with David Lynch. Mammoth Records, 1998.
 900 Years: Hildegard von Bingen. Sequentia. Box Set (8 discs), contains: Symphoniae, Canticles of ecstasy, Voice of the Blood, O Jerusalem, Saints (2 discs), Ordo virtutum (1997 recording, 2 discs). RCA 77505, 1998.
 Hildegard von Bingen: Hildegard von Bingen. Garmarna. Music Network Records Group AB, MNWCD 365, 2001.
 Healing Chants by Hildegard of Bingen. Norma Gentile. Healing Chants, 2002.
 Hildegard von Bingen In Portrait. (incl. Ordo Virtutum Vox Animae, dir. Michael Fields).  Includes Hildegard, dramatised BBC documentary starring Patricia Routledge; A Real Mystic, interview and lecture with Professor Michael Fox; A Source of Inspiration, Washington National Cathedral documentary on her life and times; Illuminations, art gallery of her mystic visions with comments by Professor Michael Fox. Double DVD BBC/Opus Arte OA 0874 D, 2003.
 O nobilissima viriditas. Sinfonye, dir. Stevie Wishart. Vol. 3. Celestial Harmonies 13129, 2004.
 O viridissima virga. ensemble amarcord, on "Nun komm, der Heiden Heiland" Raumklang 2005
 The Origin of Fire: Music and Visions of Hildegard von Bingen. Anonymous 4, Harmonia Mundi 907327, 2005.
 Meditation Chants of Hildegard Von Bingen. Norma Gentile. Healing Chants, 2008.
 Electric Ordo Virtutum. Hildegurls. Innova Recordings, 2009.
 Visions of Paradise – A Hildegard von Bingen Anthology. Sequentia. Deutsche Harmonia Mundi/Sony Classics, 2009
 Der Ozean im Fingerhut. Hildegard von Bingen, Mechthild von Magdeburg, Hadewijch und Etty Hillesum im Gespräch. Hörspiel von Hildegard Elisabeth Keller. 2 Audio-CDs. VDF-Verlag 2011.
 Hildegard von Bingen – Du aber sei ohne Angst. Ensemble Cosmedin. Zweitausendeins Edition, 2012.
 Hildegard von Bingen – Inspiration. Ensemble VocaMe, dir. Michael Popp. Berlin Classics 2012.
 Hildegard von Bingen: Celestial Hierarchy. Sequentia, dir. Benjamin Bagby. Deutsche Harmonia Mundi (Sony) 2013
 Hildegard: Vespers for Hildegard. Stevie Wishart, performed by Sinfonye with Guy Sigsworth, produced by Stevie Wishart & Guy Sigsworth, Decca, 2012

External links 
 Discography at medieval.org

Discography
Discographies of classical composers
Discographies of German artists